Statistics of Cambodian League for the 2009 season.

League table

Playoffs

Semi-finals

Third place

Final

Top scorers

References

C-League seasons
Cambodia
Cambodia
1